Deh Now (also known as Deh-i-Nau) is a village in Kavir Rural District, Deyhuk District, Tabas County, South Khorasan Province, Iran. At the 2006 census, its population was 508, in 130 families.

References 

Populated places in Tabas County